Johnny Martino (born May 5, 1937) is an actor who was born and raised in Brooklyn, New York. He played the foot-soldier Paulie Gatto in the American crime film The Godfather.

Martino began his acting career in a play titled Hat Full of Rain. He then went on to act in a single episode of the 1960s CBS television show, The Wild Wild West.

Filmography

Film

Television

References

External links

1937 births
Living people
American male film actors
American male television actors
People from Brooklyn